Jamal Ford-Robinson (born 11 September 1993) is a rugby union player who plays for Premiership Rugby side Gloucester. Jamal can also be found live streaming on the popular gaming platform Twitch under the username jfordrob.

Jamal has also spent time wrestling under the ring name 'Krisys' before returning to play for Bristol Rugby.

Club career
Beginning his rugby career in Leicester Tigers's Academy structure, Ford-Robinson then moved to National League 1 club Cambridge for two seasons before progressing to RFU Championship side Cornish Pirates in 2014.

Ford-Robinson then switched to Bristol Rugby for the 2015/16 season and aided in their promotion into the Aviva Premiership that season. The prop made 48 appearances in a Bristol shirt and suffered with the club as they were relegated back to the Championship at the end of the 2016/17 campaign. The young prop left his hometown of Bristol to join Northampton Saints for the 2017/18 season after signing for the Midlands club on February 2, 2017. In March 2019, Ford-Robinson signed a 2-year deal with Premiership Rivals Gloucester Rugby. Following the COVID-19 pandemic in early 2020, Jamal started making humorous videos on the video-sharing website TikTok. The videos gained wide attention from the rugby community which lead to Ford-Robinson winning Premiership Rugby's Community Player of the Month.

International career
Before joining Northampton, Ford-Robinson was noticed by England and was first called into the international team that defeated the Barbarians in a non-cap friendly at Twickenham on 28 May 2017, before being added to the touring squad that travelled to Argentina in the summer of 2017 as injury cover for Worcester Warriors' Nick Schonert.

References

External links
 Gloucester Profile
 

1993 births
Living people
Bristol Bears players
Cornish Pirates players
English rugby union players
Gloucester Rugby players
Northampton Saints players
Rugby union players from Bristol
Rugby union props